The Range is a suburb in the Rockhampton Region, Queensland, Australia. In the  The Range had a population of 5,400 people.

Geography 
The suburb is built on the Athelstane Range with Agnes Street approximating the ridge line.

History 
The suburb takes its name from the Athelstane Range, which was named in turn for Mount Athelstane, the name of the house built by lands commissioner William Wiseman circa 1859. Rockhampton's first water storage was built on the top of Governor's Hill (part of Atheltstane Range) in 1875.

Rockhampton Grammar School was built in Agnes Street in 1883 and is the oldest school in Rockhampton.

At the 2006 census, The Range had a population of 5,731.

In the 2011 census, The Range had a population of 5369 people.

In the  The Range had a population of 5,400 people.

Heritage listings 
The Range has a number of heritage-listed properties, including:
 155 Agnes Street: Rockhampton Girls Grammar School
 248 Agnes Street: Rudd Residence
 263 Agnes Street: The Range Convent and High School
 Archer Street: Rockhampton Grammar School
 Canning Street: Medical superintendent's residence, Rockhampton Base Hospital
 Canning Street: Therapies Building, Rockhampton Base Hospital
 49 Jessie Street: Amla (house)
 30 Nathan Street: Wiseman's Cottage
 Penlington Street: Rockhampton War Memorial
 100 Spencer Street: Rockhampton Botanic Gardens
 25 Ward Street: Clancholla
 31 Ward Street: Kenmore House
 74 Ward Street: Yungaba Migrant Hostel
 86 Ward Street: Killowen

References

External links

 

 
Suburbs of Rockhampton